Jamitha Teacher is a women's activist in Kerala, India and is the first woman to lead Friday prayers in India for a mixed congregation that had both men and women. She is the General Secretary of Quran Sunnat Society.

Early life
She is the youngest of 13 children. Her father was an Indian Army soldier. She studied in the Jamia Nadwiyya Arabic College in Malappuram.

Death threats
Her actions have sparked a negative response from some sections, with members of Muslim organisations threatening to kill her, according to local media. However, she says, "These are extremists who cannot tolerate any reform. I have had threats on WhatsApp, on YouTube, on Facebook, but I am not scared." She also said that "If need be I will ask for police protection but I will continue. How can India as country develop if we don't change all the things that are holding women back?"

References

Living people
Year of birth missing (living people)
Indian feminists
Proponents of Islamic feminism
Muslim reformers